NEMS may refer to:

 Gorilla Nems, an American rapper and internet personality from Coney Island, Brooklyn, New York
 Nanoelectromechanical systems
 National Energy Modeling System, a US government energy policy model
 NEMS AS, a Norwegian software and advisory company
 NEMS Enterprises (label), a record label based in Argentina 
 NEMS Enterprises, Brian Epstein's musical act management company
 Northeast Middle School (disambiguation)

See also
NEM (disambiguation)